Double L Excentric Gyratory is a sculpture by American artist George Rickey. There are three editions. One is installed at the intersection of Larking and Fulton streets, outside the Main Library, in San Francisco's Civic Center, in the U.S. state of California. Another is part of the Auckland Art Gallery's International Art Collection. This stainless steel sculpture, dated 1985, measures 7163 x 3543 mm and was gifted by the Edmiston Trust.

See also

 1985 in art

References

External links
 
 George Rickey: Double L Excentric Gyratory II at the Public Art Fund
 Double L Excentric Gyratory II, 1981 at the Williams College Museum of Art

1985 sculptures
Civic Center, San Francisco
Outdoor sculptures in San Francisco
Sculptures by American artists
Sculptures in New Zealand
Stainless steel sculptures
Steel sculptures in California